Vaceuchelus ampullus is a species of sea snail, a marine gastropod mollusk in the family Chilodontidae.

Description
(Original description)The shell is globose-conic, imperforate in the young, narrowly umbilicated or reduced to a fissure in the adult. It is whitish, spotted with red on the revolving ribs. The whorls of the spire are quadrate, separated by a linear suture. The body whorl is convex, except a little flattening at the suture.

The sculpture of the penultimate whorl consists of three equally thick, obtuse, and plain cinguli (= colored bands or spiral ornamentation), separated from one another and from the sutures by nearly equal interspaces, with or without a small riblet in each interval. All over regularly clathrate, the interstitial pits are narrowly oblong. The body whorl contains about eight cinguli, clathrate in the intervals: the supra-peripheral intervals show a riblet. The four basal cinguli are granulose. 

The aperture is roundly oval. The outer and basal margins are smooth within. The columella is arcuate, slightly explanulate concave and edentulous.

Distribution
This marine species is endemic to Australia (New South Wales, Queensland, South Australia, Tasmania, Victoria, Western Australia).

References

 Shirley, J. 1913. Additions to the Marine Mollusca of Queensland. Proceedings of the Royal Society of Queensland 24: 55-56
 Hedley, C. 1915. Studies on Australian Mollusca. Part XII. Proceedings of the Linnean Society of New South Wales 39: 695–755, pls 77–85 
 Hedley, C. 1918. A checklist of the marine fauna of New South Wales. Part 1. Journal and Proceedings of the Royal Society of New South Wales 51: M1–M120
 Cotton, B.C. 1945. Southern Australian Gastropoda. Part 1. Streptoneura. Transactions of the Royal Society of South Australia 69(1): 150-171
 Thornley, G. 1951. Marine shell collecting on the north coast of New South Wales. Proceedings of the Royal Zoological Society of New South Wales 1949-1950: 44-52
 Cotton, B. C. (1959). South Australian Mollusca. Archaeogastropoda. Handbook of the Flora and Fauna of South Australia Series. South Australian Branch of British Science Guild. W. L. Hawes, Government Printer, Adelaide. p. 1-448.
 Poppe G.T., Tagaro S.P. & Dekker H. (2006) The Seguenziidae, Chilodontidae, Trochidae, Calliostomatidae and Solariellidae of the Philippine Islands. Visaya Supplement 2: 1-228.

External links
 Beechey, D. 2000. Euchelus ampullus Tate, 1893
 To World Register of Marine Species

ampullus
Gastropods described in 1893
Gastropods of Australia